David Anthony Athelstan Gray (19 June 1922 – 9 November 2003) was an English cricketer. He played for Cambridge University and Essex in 1947.

References

External links
 
 

1922 births
2003 deaths
Cambridge University cricketers
English cricketers
Essex cricketers
Sportspeople from Kensington
Cricketers from Greater London